Tarsis Bazana Kabwegyere  is a Ugandan sociologist, academic and politician. He is the current{{when minister of general duties, Office of the Prime Minister in the Ugandan cabinet. He was appointed to that position on 23 May 2013. Before that, from 15 August 2012 until 23 May 2013, he was the minister of gender, labour and social affairs. At first, the parliamentary committee vetting cabinet appointments rejected his selection, but after discussions between President Yoweri Museveni and Speaker Rebecca Kadaga, he was finally approved on 7 September 2012. Earlier, he was the minister of disaster relief and planning in the Ugandan cabinet, from 1 June 2006 until 27 May 2011. In the cabinet reshuffle of 27 May 2011, he was dropped from the cabinet and was replaced by Stephen Mallinga. He was also the elected member of parliament representing Igara County West, Bushenyi District, from 1996 until 2011.

Background and education
He was born in Bushenyi District on 26 April 1941. He has the degree of Bachelor of Arts in sociology. His Master of Arts degree is in political sociology. He also has a degree of Doctor of Philosophy in the same field. All his academic degrees were awarded by Makerere University, Uganda's oldest and largest public university, founded in 1922.

After Idi Amin's seizure of power in Uganda in 1971, Kabwegyere joined the Save Uganda Movement, a militant group attempting to overthrow Amin.

Career
Following the fall of the Amin's regime in 1979, Kabwegyere was appointed minister of lands and natural resources, having that position until 1980. From 1982 until 1987, he was the head of the Department of Sociology in the Faculty of Social Sciences at Makerere University. Following the removal of Milton Obote from power and the overthrow of the military junta of Tito Okello, Kabwegyere became a member of the National Resistance Council, the parliamentary body in Uganda from 1986 until 1996.

He was also served the state minister for foreign affairs from 1987 until 1991. Between 1991 and 1996, he was the director of external relations at the National Resistance Movement Secretariat. He was appointed to the Disaster Relief Ministry in June 2006, until he was dropped from the cabinet in May 2011.

He continuously represented Igara County West, Bushenyi District in the Uganda Parliament from 1996 until 2011. In 2010, he was defeated during the primary elections by Raphael Magezi, also of the National Resistance Movement political party, the incumbent member of parliament.

Personal details
Kabwegyere is married. He belongs to the National Resistance Movement political party. He is reported to enjoy playing lawn tennis and participating in debates.

See also
 Parliament of Uganda
 Cabinet of Uganda
 Bushenyi District

References

External links
 Full Ministerial Cabinet List, June 2006
 Full Ministerial Cabinet List, February 2009
Full Ministerial Cabinet List, May 2011
Full Cabinet List As At 1 March 2015 

1941 births
Living people
Ankole people
People educated at Ntare School
People from Bushenyi District
National Resistance Movement politicians
Makerere University alumni
People from Western Region, Uganda
Government ministers of Uganda
Members of the Parliament of Uganda
21st-century Ugandan politicians
Save Uganda Movement